Tilman Brück (born 10 December 1970) is a German economist specializing in development and the economics of peace, conflict and terrorism. He was full professor of development economics at Humboldt University of Berlin. He also headed the department of Development and Security at the German Institute for Economic Research (DIW).

Brück is an expert on the economics of developing and transition countries such as Colombia, Mozambique, Angola, Uganda, Mongolia and the countries of Central Asia. In September 2012 it was announced that he was to replace Bates Gill as head of the Stockholm International Peace Research Institute, a global think-tank dedicated to research into security, conflict and arms control. Brück took up the Director's position in January 2013 and stepped down in June 2014.

Education

Brück studied for masters and doctorate degrees in economics at the University of Oxford, St Cross College, between 1996 and 2001. Prior to this he studied economics at the University of Glasgow. He was also a visiting lecturer at the University of Rome, Tor Vergata. He speaks English, German and Portuguese.

Research interests

Brück's research interests include the inter-relationship between peace, security and development (especially at the micro-level), the economics of post-war reconstruction, and the economics of terrorism and security policy.

Select publications

Books

Articles

Professional Affiliations

Households in Conflict Network (HiCN), co-director
Institute of the Study of Labor, research fellow
Stockholm International Peace Research Institute
Global Young Academy, founding fellow

References

External links
SIPRI Website
SIPRI Biography

German economists
Living people
Alumni of the University of Glasgow
Alumni of St Cross College, Oxford
1970 births